Torulene (3',4'-didehydro-β,γ-carotene) is a carotene (a hydrocarbon carotenoid) which is notable for being synthesized by red pea aphids (Acyrthosiphon pisum), imparting the natural red color to the aphids, which aids in their camouflage and escape from predation. The aphids have gained the ability to synthesize torulene by horizontal gene transfer of a number of genes for carotenoid synthesis, apparently from fungi. Plants, fungi, and microorganisms can synthesize carotenoids, but torulene made by pea aphids is the only carotenoid known to be synthesized by an organism in the animal kingdom.

References 

Carotenoids
Plant physiology
Cyclohexenes